Matija Golik (born 26 May 1993) is a Croatian handballer who plays as centre back for Croatian club RK Umag.

Golik also played for eight seasons in his hometown club RK Zamet. In 2012 he helped his side reach the Croatian Cup final where they lost to Croatia Osiguranje Zagreb.

References

External links
 Player Info in European competitions
 Player info in Premier league

1993 births
Living people
Handball players from Rijeka
Croatian male handball players
RK Zamet players
Expatriate handball players
Croatian expatriate sportspeople in Slovenia